"Invisible" is a song by Swedish singer Zara Larsson for the soundtrack to the 2019 Netflix original animated film Klaus. It was written by Larsson, Justin Tranter, Alfonso González Aguilar, Caroline Pennell and Jussi Karvinen, the latter was the one who produced it. The single was released on November 8, 2019 and the official music video was released on November 15 of the same year.

Composition 
"Invisible" is a pop ballad written by Larsson and Justin Tranter, who were assisted by Jussifer y Caroline Pennell. Zara described the song as "beautiful" and his "message of kindness speaks perfectly to the message of Klaus. I think it can inspire all of us to be a little compassionate to one another".

Tranter says "that director Sergio Pablos told them the theme of Klaus, and showed them parts of storyboard. After this, Tranter began writing lyrics with a focus on that theme. Pablos wanted the song to have traditional Scandanivan influences, so Tranter worked with a Scandanivan producer in order to achieve the desired sound".

Live performances 
Larsson performed the song live for the first time on The Ellen DeGeneres Show on 3 December 2019.

Awards and nominations

Charts

Weekly charts

Release history

References

2019 singles
2019 songs
Pop ballads
Zara Larsson songs
Epic Records singles
Sony Music singles
Songs written by Justin Tranter
Songs written by Zara Larsson
Songs written for animated films
Songs written by Caroline Pennell
Songs written by Jussifer